Karuna Trust may refer to:

 Karuna Trust (UK) - A UK-based charity working for deprived people in South Asia
 Karuna Trust (India) - An Indian charity working for deprived people in two Indian states, mainly in health care
 Karuna Trust (Sri Lanka) - A Sri Lankan volunteer organisation working for the deprived people there